WIDP (channel 46) is a Spanish-language religious television station licensed to Guayama, Puerto Rico. Founded January 25, 1990, the station is owned by Ebenezer Broadcasting Group. The station also had an analog on-channel booster, WIDP1 in Las Palmas, Puerto Rico. WIDP's studios are located in Simón Madera Avenue in San Juan with its transmitter at Barrio Cubuy in Canovanas.

In September 2009, WIDP debuted a subchannel named EBN Music, which airs religious music videos 24/7.

Digital Television

References

External links 

Television channels and stations established in 1997
Guayama, Puerto Rico
1997 establishments in Puerto Rico
Christian television stations in Puerto Rico